A deputy lieutenant of Angus is commissioned by the Lord Lieutenant of Angus.

Deputy lieutenants support the work of the lord-lieutenant. There can be several deputy lieutenants at any time, depending on the population of the county. Their appointment does not terminate with the changing of the lord-lieutenant, but they usually retire at age 75.

20th Century
30 January 1960: Major James Neil Ballingall Pattullo
8 September 1960: Major Thomas Prain Douglas Murray, 
30 March 1961: Lieutenant-Colonel and Brevet Colonel Donald William Murray Morrison, 
30 March 1961: Lieutenant Colonel Moir Patrick Stormonith-Darling
29 September 1964: Honorary Captain The Earl of Airlie, 
21 April 1969: Lieutenant-Colonel Leslie George Gray-Cheape
1 December 1971: Lieutenant Colonel William John Campbell Adamson, 
1 December 1971: Colonel George Willoughby Dunn, 
1 December 1971: Lieutenant Colonel and Brevet Colonel Andrew Beatty Houstoun, 
1 December 1971: Commandant Dame Evelyn Louisa Elizabeth Hoyer-Millar, 
27 July 1973: Captain The Earl of Strathmore and Kinghorne
19 August 1977: Colonel John George Mathieson, 
19 August 1977: Colonel Charles Newbigging Thomson, 
19 August 1977: Captain Charles Alastair Ogilvy MacLean
28 March 1984: John Raoul Wilmot Stansfeld, Esq., 
12 July 1984: Ruth Dundas
29 August 1984: Robert Scrymgoure Steuart Fothringham, Esq.
18 July 1985: Major General Rodenck Jams Ephraums, 
18 January 1988: Baroness Carnegy of Lour
18 January 1988: The Lord Lyell
11 May 1989: Graham Noel Johnston Smart, Esq.
19 April 1993: The Rt. Hon. The Earl of Strathmore and Kinghorne
19 April 1993: William Henry Porter, Esq.
19 April 1993: The Hon. The Earl of Dalhousie, 
19 April 1993: Brigadier Lyndon Bolton, 
27 March 1997: Colonel Michael John Christian Anstice,

21st Century
29 October 2003: Frances Elsbeth Duncan, 
29 October 2003: Margaret Young Bett
29 October 2003: Colonel Jonathan Roy Hensman, 
12 January 2010: Robina Addison, 
2 August 2016: Norman Atkinson, 
2 August 2016: Hugh Campbell Adamson
2 August 2016: Ian Lamb
2 August 2016: Deborah Porter
30 July 2021: Major General Martin Linn Smith,

References